John M. Gilroy  (October 26, 1875 – August 4, 1897) was a 19th-century Major League Baseball pitcher, outfielder and catcher.

Early life
John M. Gilroy was born on October 16, 1875 in Washington, D.C.

Career
Gilroy worked for the U.S. Department of War. In 1894, he joined the War Department's baseball team. He also played for the Washington Stars, an amateur baseball team.

Gilroy played for the Washington Senators of the National League during the 1895 and 1896 baseball seasons. He was playing with the Norfolk Jewels of the Atlantic League in 1897 when he died.

Death

Gilroy died on August 4, 1897 in Norfolk, Virginia. He was interred at Mount Olivet Cemetery in Washington, D.C.

References

External links

Baseball Reference

1875 births
1897 deaths
19th-century baseball players
Major League Baseball pitchers
Major League Baseball outfielders
Washington Senators (1891–1899) players
Norfolk Braves players
Norfolk Jewels players
Baseball players from Washington, D.C.
Burials at Mount Olivet Cemetery (Washington, D.C.)
United States Department of War officials